The Clue of the New Pin is a 1929 British crime film directed by Arthur Maude and starring Benita Hume, Kim Peacock, and Donald Calthrop. It was made at Beaconsfield Studios.

The film was one of only 10 filmed in British Phototone, a sound-on-disc system which used 12-inch discs. All of the other nine films made in this process were short films. In March 1929, this film and The Crimson Circle, filmed in the De Forest Phonofilm sound-on-film system, were 'trade-shown' to cinema exhibitors.

This film is an adaptation of the 1923 novel The Clue of the New Pin by Edgar Wallace. It was later remade in 1961.

Plot
A wealthy recluse is murdered in an absolutely sealed room.

Cast
 Benita Hume as Ursula Ardfern 
 Kim Peacock as Tab Holland 
 Donald Calthrop as Yeh Ling 
 John Gielgud as Rex Trasmere 
 Harold Saxon-Snell as Walters 
 Johnny Butt as Wellington Briggs 
 Colin Kenny as Inspector Carver

References

Bibliography
 Low, Rachael. History of the British Film, 1918-1929. George Allen & Unwin, 1971.

External links

The Clue of the New Pin (1929) at SilentEra

1929 films
1929 crime films
Films directed by Arthur Maude
Films based on British novels
Films based on works by Edgar Wallace
British crime films
Films shot at Beaconsfield Studios
Transitional sound films
British black-and-white films
1920s English-language films
1920s British films